Gheada is a term in Galician to describe the debuccalisation of the voiced velar stop  to a, usually voiceless, back fricative, most often a voiceless pharyngeal fricative .

Although it is found throughout Galicia, its use is declining in Lugo and eastern Ourense, and it is rarely encountered in education or broadcasting. While it is neither considered incorrect nor stigmatised, it is generally considered appropriate only for familiar rather than formal domains.

Occasionally, the sound is articulated as a voiceless velar fricative , as in Castilian jamón.

Orthography
The pronunciation is sometimes indicated by the digraph gh:
 gato ("cat") >  
 pago ("payment") >

Phonetic realizations 
Pharyngeal realizations of the gheada are the most common, but there's considerable variation. Speakers from inland villages tend to prefer uvular, pharyngeal, or glottal fricatives, which are often voiced between vowels. In contrast, speakers from coastal villages prefer velar, pharyngeal, or occasional uvular fricatives, which are always voiceless.

Possible systems 
There are three different systems of gheada. In the most widespread one,  is pronounced as a voiceless fricative in any position. For example:

This system is found in the major cities of Galicia: Santiago, Pontevedra, and A Coruña, as well as in the eastern part of the Province of A Coruña.

Another system has both  and voiceless fricative allophones:

In this system, found in the western parts of Ourense and Lugo, northern areas of Pontevedra, and south-eastern areas of A Coruña,  is only found after a nasal consonant in the middle of words.

A third system has merged  into , eliminating the  allophone completely:

This system is found in the western parts of Galicia, in Fisterra and the Ría de Muros.

See also
Phonological history of Spanish coronal fricatives
Lenition

References

Sources

External links
Map of gheada and seseo use in Galician-speaking areas

Galician language